Stenar (2501 m) is a mountain in Julian Alps in the Razor and Prisojnik group.  The top of the mountain offers a good panoramic view of the surrounding mountains.

Starting points
 Bovec, Zadnjica
 Kranjska gora, Krnica
 Kranjska gora, Vrata

Routes
The route from Zadnjica is relatively easy to ascend; other routes are more challenging
 4½h: from Aljažev dom v Vratih (1015 m), over Sovatna
 5½h: from Koča v Krnici, over Križ
 2h: from Bivaka Na Rušju (1980 m), over 

See also
 Slovenian Mountain Hiking Trail

References

External links
 
 Stenar on Hribi.net
 Stenar on planinec.si

Mountains of the Julian Alps
Two-thousanders of Slovenia
Triglav National Park